Karsten Schwan (August 21, 1952 – September 28, 2015) was an American computer pioneer,  academic who had held the position of Professor of Computer Science and the director of Center for Experimental Research in Computer Systems (CERCS) at the Georgia Institute of Technology.

Biography 
Schwan grew up in Oldenburg, Germany, the second of five children to Werner and Erika Schwans. He had a life-changing experience in his teens when his father who worked for the West German-American military was sent to El Paso, Texas for two years. It sparked in him a love of travel and of the U.S. His hobbies included reading science fiction books, hiking, and gardening. An East Frisian man, he greatly enjoyed starting his day with a big breakfast of fresh bread and cheese, and a regular Teetied with a traditional East Frisian tea ceremony.

He earned his B.S. degree at West Germany’s Christian-Albrechts Universitaet. Later, he received M.S. and Ph.D. degrees from Carnegie Mellon University where he began his research in high performance computing, addressing operating and programming systems support for the Cm* multiprocessor. During the graduate school, he married Cheryl Gaimon, who later becomes Regents’ Professor at Georgia Institute of Technology. His thesis, “Tailoring Software for Multiple Processor Systems,” was selected as one of six theses in 1982 to be printed as a book in the “Computer Science Series” by UMI Research Press.

In 1983, Schwan started at Ohio State University as an Assistant Professor. He has two children: Valerie Ringland and Phillip Gaimon.
He established the PArallel, Real-time Systems (PARTS) Laboratory, containing both custom embedded processors and commercial parallel machines, and conducting research on operating and programming system support for cluster computing and for adaptive real-time systems. In 1988, Schwan moved to Georgia Institute of Technology as an Associate Professor with tenure. In 2001 he co-founded CERCS, the Center for Experimental Research in Computer Systems. He became a Regents' professor in 2010.

He had two children with Cheryl, Valerie Ringland and Phil Gaimon.

Awards 
He won the 2008 HP Labs Innovation Research Award and is elected IEEE Fellow at 2016 posthumously.

Since 2016, the International Conference on Autonomic Conference (ICAC) and High-Performance Parallel and Distributed Computing (HPDC) have named the Best Paper awards after Schwan.

Ph.D. students

He has advised a number of notable Ph.D. candidates, including:

 Hasan Abbasi, Oak Ridge National Laboratory
 Sandip Agarwala, IBM Almaden
 Hrishikesh Amur, Google
 Emily Angerer, Virginia Tech
 Tom Bihari, Nationwide
 Ben Blake, Cleveland State University
 Win Bo, Trilogy
 Fabian Bustamante, Professor at Northwestern University
 Zhongtang Cai, Oracle
 Yuan Chen, HP Labs
 Dilma Da Silva, CS Chair at Texas A&M University
 Jai Dayal, Intel
 Subramanya Dulloor, Intel Labs
 Greg Eisenhauer, Georgia Tech
 Naila Farooqui, Intel Labs
 Harold Forbes, Baylor University
 Ivan Ganev, Intel Labs
 Ada Gavrilovska, Georgia Tech
 Ahmed Gheith, IBM Austin
 Prabha Gopinath, Honeywell
 Anshuman Goswami, NVIDIA
 Weiming Gu, IBM Austin
 Vishal Gupta, VMware
 Vishakha Gupta, Intel
 Kaushik Ghosh, Juniper Networks
 Qi He, IBM Software Group
 Liting Hu, Florida International University
 Daniela Ivan-Rosu, IBM T.J. Watson
 Minsung Jang, AT&T Labs
 Byron A Jeff, Georgia State University
 Sudarsun Kannan, Rutgers University 
 Mukil Kesavan, VMware
 Carol Kilpatrick, St. Johns Group
 Jiantao Kong, Google
 Robin Kravets, Professor at the University of Illinois at Urbana-Champaign
 Rajaram B. Krishnamurthy, IBM
 Sanjay Kumar, Intel Labs
 Vibhore Kumar, IBM T.J. Watson
 Min Lee, Intel Labs
 Jay Lofstead, Sandia National Labs
 Mohammed Mansour, Microsoft
 Alexander Merritt, Intel Corporation
 Bodhi Mukherjee, Google
 Ripal Nathuji, NeoTek Labs
 David Ogle, IBM
 Beth Plale, Indiana University
 Christian Poellabauer, Professor at Florida International University
 Himanshu Raj, Microsoft Corp.
 Rajiv Ramnath, Ohio State University, NSF
 Adit Ranadive, VMware
 Marcel Rosu, Bloomberg
 Phyllis Schneck, Homeland Security
 Dipanjan Sengupta, Intel Labs
 Sangeetha Seshadri, IBM Almaden
 Balasubramanian Seshasayee, Intel Labs
 Priyanka Tembey, VMware
 Jeffrey Vetter, Oak Ridge National Laboratory
 Chengwei Wang, AT&T Labs
 Rich West, Boston University
 Patrick Widener, Sandia National Laboratories
 Mary Jean Willshire, University of Portland
 Fang Zheng, IBM T.J.Watson
 Dong Zhou, Apple
 Hongyi Zhou, Sycamore Networks

 Jian Huang, University of Illinois at Urbana-Champaign

References

External links
 

Georgia Tech faculty
Carnegie Mellon University alumni
1952 births
2015 deaths